Wenceslau Malta (15 December 1931 – 27 January 2011) was a Brazilian modern pentathlete. He competed at the 1956 and 1960 Summer Olympics.

References

External links
 

1931 births
2011 deaths
Brazilian male modern pentathletes
Olympic modern pentathletes of Brazil
Modern pentathletes at the 1956 Summer Olympics
Modern pentathletes at the 1960 Summer Olympics
Sportspeople from Rio Grande do Sul
Pan American Games gold medalists for Brazil
Pan American Games medalists in modern pentathlon
Pan American Games silver medalists for Brazil
Competitors at the 1959 Pan American Games
Medalists at the 1959 Pan American Games
20th-century Brazilian people
21st-century Brazilian people